Abby Kohn is an American screenwriter and director. She is best known for writing popular romantic comedy films such as Never Been Kissed, He's Just Not That Into You, Valentine's Day and How to Be Single. She also co-wrote the romantic drama film The Vow. Kohn's first co-writing and directing feature film was the 2018 comedy, I Feel Pretty, starring Amy Schumer and Michelle Williams. Kohn and her frequent collaborator Marc Silverstein met in the MFA program at the USC School of Cinematic Arts in Los Angeles, California. According to the website Boxofficemojo, their films have grossed over $900m.

In May 2019, New Line Cinema acquired film rights to the television series Three's Company with Abby Kohn and Marc Silverstein to pen the screenplay. Robert Cort and Don Taffner Jr. will produce the film and plan to have it set in mid-1970s Santa Monica.

Personal life

Kohn is a graduate of Northwestern University in Evanston, Illinois. In 2006, she married music producer Jason Linn with whom she has two children.

Filmography

With Marc Silverstein

References

External links

Living people
American women screenwriters
American Jews
American television producers
American women television producers
Place of birth missing (living people)
Year of birth missing (living people)
American women film directors
Northwestern University alumni
USC School of Cinematic Arts alumni
20th-century American screenwriters
20th-century American women writers
21st-century American screenwriters
21st-century American women writers